Live in London is the second EP by American pop rock band R5. The EP was released on May 29, 2014 by Hollywood only for digital download. The album is the recording of the series of videos released on VEVO.

Track listing

Release history

References

R5 (band) albums
2014 EPs
2014 live albums
Live EPs